Bannu is a city in Pakistan.

Bannu may also refer to:

Bannu District, a district of Khyber Pakhtunkhwa, Pakistan
Bannu Division, an administrative unit of Khyber Pakhtunkhwa, Pakistan
Bannu Airport, an airport in Pakistan
Bannu railway station, a railway station in Pakistan

See also
Bannu Biradari, a Hindu community
Bannu Brigade, a former part of India's Northern Command
Bannu Resolution, a resolution from Pashtun community to British Raj in 1947
 
 Banu (disambiguation)